Rubab, Robab or Rabab (Pashto / Persian: رُباب, Kashmiri : رَبابہٕ, Sindhi:  (Nastaleeq), रबाब (Devanagari), Azerbaijani / Turkish: Rübab, Tajik / Uzbek рубоб) is a lute-like musical instrument. The rubab, one of the national musical instruments of Afghanistan, is also commonly played in Pakistan and India by Pashtuns, Balochis, Sindhis, Kashmiris and Punjabis. The rubab has three variants, the Kabuli rebab of Afghanistan, the Seni rebab of northern India and the Pamiri rubab of Tajikistan. The instrument and its variants spread throughout West, Central, South and Southeast Asia. The Kabuli rebab from Afghanistan derives its name from the Arabic rebab and is played with a bow while in Central Asia and the Indian subcontinent, the instrument is plucked and is distinctly different in construction.

Size variants

Components

In detail about the strings:

Construction

The body is carved out of a single piece of wood, with a head covering a hollow bowl which provides the sound-chamber. The bridge sits on the skin and is held in position by the tension of the strings. It has three melody strings tuned in fourths, two or three drone strings and up to 15 sympathetic strings. The instrument is made from the trunk of a mulberry tree, the head from an animal skin such as goat, and the strings from the intestines of young goats (gut) or nylon.

History

The rubab is known as "the lion of instruments" and is one of the two national instruments of Afghanistan (with the zerbaghali). Classical Afghan music often features this instrument as a key component. Elsewhere it is known as the Kabuli rebab in contrast to the Seni rebab of India. In appearance, the Kabuli rubab looks slightly different from the Indian rubab. It is the ancestor of the north Indian sarod, although unlike the sarod, it is fretted.

The rubab is attested from the 7th century CE. It is mentioned in old Persian books, and many Sufi poets mention it in their poems. It is the traditional instrument of Khorasan and is widely used in countries such as Afghanistan, Pakistan, Azerbaijan, Iran, Turkey, Iraq, Tajikistan, and Uzbekistan, as well as in the Xinjiang province of northwest China and the Jammu and Kashmir and Punjab regions of northwest India.

The rubab was the first instrument used in Sikhism; it was used by Bhai Mardana, companion of the first guru, Guru Nanak. Whenever a shabad was revealed to Guru Nanak he would sing and Bhai Mardana would play on his rubab; he was known as a rababi. The rubab playing tradition is carried on by Sikhs such as Namdharis.

Variants
In northern India, the seni rebab, which emerged during the Mughal Empire, has "a large hook at the back of its head, making it easier for a musician to sling it over the shoulder and play it even while walking." The Sikh rabab was traditionally a local Punjabi variant known as the 'Firandia' rabab (Punjabi: ਫਿਰੰਦੀਆ ਰਬਾਬ Phiradī'ā rabāba), however Baldeep Singh, an expert in the Sikh musical tradition, challenges this narrative.

In Tajikistan a similar but somewhat distinct rubab-i-pamir (Pamiri rubab) is played, employing a shallower body and neck. The rubab of the Pamir area has six gut strings, one of which, rather than running from the head to the bridge, is attached partway down the neck, similar to the fifth string of the American banjo.

Notable players
 Ustad Mohammed Omar (1905—1980), Rabab player From Kabul, Afghanistan
 Ustad Rahim Khushnawaz (1945-2010), Rabab Player From Herat, Afghanistan
 Ustad Homayun Sakhi, Rabab Player From Kabul, Afghanistan
 Ustad Ramin Saqizada, Rabab Player From Afghanistan 
 Ustad Sadiq Sameer, Rabab Player, From Afghanistan 
 Ustad Shahzaib Khan, Rabab Player From Nowshera/Nokhar, Pakistan
 Ustad Waqar Atal, Rabab Player, From Peshawer, Pakistan 
 John Baily, Emeritus Professor of Ethnomusicology at Goldsmiths, University of London 
 Khaled Arman (b. 1965), Rabab Player and Guitarist From Kabul, Afghanistan 
Daud Khan Sadozai, Afghan Rubab and Sarod Player from Kabul Afghanistan

See also
 Rababi
 Rebab
 Rebec
 Sarod

References

External links

Video, rubab being played. Part of performance is slide rubab, like slide guitar.
Existence of rubab threatened in modern Afghanistan.
Will the Taliban Stop the Music in Afghanistan?
 Farabi School 
 World Music Central - Ustad Mohammad Omar 
 Music of the Uyghurs

Azerbaijani musical instruments
Persian musical instruments
Afghan musical instruments
Pakistani musical instruments
Indian musical instruments
Necked bowl lutes
Drumhead lutes
String instruments with sympathetic strings
Iranian inventions
Pashtun music